SPiN is a four-piece American alternative rock / power pop  band from the Philadelphia, Pennsylvania area whose first EP Home was internationally released in 2010.

"Stellar musicianship, vocals and writing make this one not to be missed" wrote music and radio industry publication the FMQB. The Philadelphia-area based band's first single, "Home", entered the charts as the second-most added song in the country for two weeks straight. It went on to peak at number 7 on FMQB's Hot AC charts. SPiN has had its songs appear in dozens of television shows in the US and has toured extensively supporting acts such as Puddle of Mudd, Hinder, Trapt, Halestorm, Fuel, Eve 6, Sponge, Charm City Devils, SafetySuit, Ra, Rev Theory, and Red during stops in 32 US states at over 1000 shows. In 2015, "Happy Together", the first single from their Stalked EP hit #1 on the iTunes Indie Rock charts and remained in the top 5 for over two months. The band's Halloween-themed single "Zombie Girl" went viral in 2018 on YouTube and has surpassed 72 million views.

Formation 
SPiN's origins can be traced back to a Wyndmoor, Pennsylvania, high school, where vocalist Eric Rothenheber and keyboardist Jim Vacca first began performing together. Guitarist Henry Cieplinski and drummer Lou Chudnofsky were added, and with the help of a local booking agent band began playing regional shows 3–5 times a week. Their performances, along with a demo cut in a friend's basement studio, helped secure national sponsorship by the herb-infused liqueur brand Jägermeister, and the band was invited to be part of the Jäger Music Tour series. SPiN's debut EP, Home was then produced by Grammy-winning producer David Ivory.

Music placements on network TV 
"Happy Together" was featured in the conclusion of episode 13 of the CBS hit show Stalker on January 21, 2015.
"Silent Night" was featured in the commercial spots for the movie Scott Pilgrim vs. the World airing on IFC (U.S. TV network) TV Network during all of November and December 2014.
"Hurt By You" was featured in the Free Beats segment on Attack of the Show.
"Not in Love" was used in the MTV Network top-rated series Teen Mom on the 2010 finale episode of season 1.  It is also featured in the popular online video game Audition Online.
"hurt by you" was used in the MTV Network series I Used To Be Fat on Episode 5 of Season 1 in 2011.
"doN't look dowN" was featured on the internationally syndicated radio show ExploreMusic with Alan Cross on February 2, 2011 who said about the band, "True DIY power pop that should turn some heads.  If not, you're not listening properly."
"home" was featured in Emmelunga market stores and Aiazzone Furniture Stores, and at WaterPark Ondablu (all in Italy).
"Not In Love" was featured on Brain Games (2011 TV series) on the National Geographic channel.
"Sing Myself" was featured on TripTank on the [Comedy Central] channel.
"My Everything" was featured in the Why I'm Not on Facebook documentary.
"The First Noel" was featured on The Detour on TBS.
"Breathe" was featured on Bid & Destroy (TV series) on Nat Geo.
"Want to Tell You" was featured on American Restoration on History.

Press 
SPiN's releases have been met with favorable press in newspapers, magazines and websites in the United States, including the Philadelphia Daily News and The Philadelphia Inquirer. Feature articles were written on the band in The Virginia Tribune, Baltimore Times, Florida Style magazine, and the Washington Informer.

Discography

Albums / EPs / Singles 
Home EP 2010
BELiEVE Album 2010
Christmas Time Again EP 2011
The Scream Inside EP 2012
Hard to Ignore EP 2013
Pushed Around EP 2013
Happy Together Single 2013
Stalked EP 2015
What A Rush EP 2015
Jar of Lies EP 2015
Just Fight (Ally's Song) Single 2016
My Hysteria EP 2016
What's Going On (feat. Nikey Knoxx) Single 2016
Meant to Rise EP 2017
All I Want for Christmas is my Two Front Teeth Single 2018
Make Me Move Album 2019
Carol of the Merry Gentlemen Single 2019
Thought I Knew You Single 2020
Dreaming Single 2022

RadioPlay/Charting

External links 
SPiN Official Website
SPiN @Facebook
SPiN @Twitter
SPiN @YouTube
SPiN @Instagram

Members 
 Eric Rothenheber: Vocals / Guitar (2010–present)
 Jim Vacca: Bass Synth / Vocals / Keyboards (2010–present)
 Henry Cieplinski: Guitar / Vocals (2010–present)
 Lou Chudnofsky: Drums (2010–present)

References

Musical groups from Pennsylvania

ko:코스 오브 네이처